Tim Johnston (born Iowa City) is the author of the story collection Irish Girl and the novels Never So Green and Descent: a novel.

Life
He graduated from the University of Iowa, and the University of Massachusetts Amherst.
He worked as a carpenter.
He is the 2011 Jenny McKean Moore Writer-in-Residence at The George Washington University.

His stories have also appeared in Best Life Magazine, California Quarterly, Colorado Review, Double Take, New England Review, New Letters, The Iowa Review, The Missouri Review, and Narrative Magazine.

Awards
Irish Girl won an O. Henry Prize, the New Letters Award for Writers, and the Gival Press Short Story Award, while the collection itself won the 2009 Katherine Anne Porter Prize in Short Fiction.

In 2005, the title story, "Irish Girl," was included in the David Sedaris anthology of favorites, Children Playing Before a Statue of Hercules.

Works

"Two Years", Narrative

References

External links
Author's blog
"Tim Johnston's Irish Girl", Iowa Review, Sara Jaffe
"Interview with Tim Johnston", Forth Magazine,  Carolyn Blais, March 12, 2010
"Interview: Tim Johnston", pagetopixels, 22 April 2011
Tim Johnston, Master Craftsman, GW English September 16, 2011

American short story writers
Living people
Writers from Iowa City, Iowa
University of Iowa alumni
University of Massachusetts Amherst alumni
Year of birth missing (living people)